Volodimir Nechiporuk (born 18 January 1949) was a self-nominated candidate in the 2004 Ukrainian presidential election. He was a national deputy of Ukraine from 1998 till 2002 and from 2002 till 2006. In that last period he has been the chair of subcommittee that controls activities of law-enforcement bodies of a Committee of the Verkhovna Rada (parliament). He is a member of Social Democratic Party of Ukraine (United). He is a co-author of the Criminal Code of Ukraine. He was first-category participant in liquidation of consequences of the 1986 accident at the Chernobyl Nuclear Power Plant. From 1991 to 1993 he was a chief of the Board of social protection of workers of law-enforcement bodies at the Ministry of Ukraine. He is a colonel of the militia. In his program, he speaks in support of 7-year terms for elections of the President of Ukraine, deputies of the Parliament, and chairs of all levels. He is also opposed to land sales.

References

1949 births
Living people
People from Khmelnytskyi Oblast
Chernobyl liquidators
Social Democratic Party of Ukraine (united) politicians
Third convocation members of the Verkhovna Rada
Fourth convocation members of the Verkhovna Rada
Candidates in the 2004 Ukrainian presidential election
Recipients of the Honorary Diploma of the Cabinet of Ministers of Ukraine